Saccharomycomorpha is a genus of non-flagellated protists with a rare yeast-like appearance, containing the single species Saccharomycomorpha psychra. It is the only genus of the family Saccharomycomorphidae, within the cercozoan order Glissomonadida. Before its description in 2021 it was known as clade T, recovered from environmental DNA in previous phylogenetic analyses.

Morphology and behavior
Saccharomycomorpha psychra is a unicellular protist composed of round unflagellated cells, which is a unique morphological characteristic among Glissomonadida. It is able to withstand temperatures of 4 °C and its optimal growth is mainly 20 °C, making it a psychrophilic organism.

Ecology
The species was isolated from lichen and moss found in both the Arctic (Svalbard) and maritime Antarctica (King George Island), respectively. These areas have a flora mainly consisting of lichens and mosses. Although glissomonads are mainly bacterivorous, Saccharomycomorpha is perhaps an osmotrophic or parasitic species, since it is able to grow in a culture medium without the presence of bacteria.

References

Cercozoa genera
Taxa described in 2021